Anak Ko (meaning "My Child" in the Tagalog language) is the third studio album by American indie musician Jay Som, released on August 23, 2019 by Polyvinyl.

Background
"Superbike" was released as the album's first single on June 4, 2019. The album was announced on the same day and a pre-order for the album was also made available. Tour dates were also revealed on the same day.

"Tenderness" was released as the album's second single on July 11, 2019, alongside a music video directed by Weird Life.

"Nighttime Drive" was released as the album's third single on August 8, 2019, alongside a music video directed by Han Hale in which Duterte and her band are investigating alien life forms.

Critical reception

Anak Ko received universal acclaim from music critics. At Metacritic, which assigns a normalised rating out of 100 to reviews from mainstream publications, the album received an average score of 82, based on nineteen reviews.

Accolades

Track listing
Credits adapted from iTunes. All tracks written and produced by Melina Duterte.

Personnel
Credits adapted from the liner notes of Anak Ko.

 Melina Duterte – vocals, instruments, recording, mixing
 Zachary Elsasser – drums 
 Justus Proffit – drums , vocals 
 Oliver Pinell – guitar , vocals 
 Taylor Vick – vocals 
 Laetitia Tamko – vocals 
 Dylan Allard – vocals 
 Annie Truscott – violin , guitar , vocals 
 Nicholas Merz – pedal steel 
 Heba Kadry – mastering
 María Medem – artwork
 Tim Reynolds - layout

References

External links 

2019 albums
Jay Som albums
Polyvinyl Record Co. albums